Joachim Ichane (born 27 June 1986) is a French professional footballer who plays as a defender for Régional 1 club FC Espaly.

Career 
Ichane started his career with Chamois Niortais, where he made three league appearances, before joining Championnat National side Laval in 2007. He played a total of 64 league matches for Laval and was part of the team that won promotion to Ligue 2 in 2009. However, he suffered a knee injury in the summer of the same year, which meant he did not make an appearance during the 2009–10 season and subsequently refused a new deal at the end of the campaign.

On 7 June 2010, Ichane signed for Reims on a two-year contract.

In July 2012, Ichane joined Championnat National side Cherbourg.

Honours
Chamois Niortais

 Championnat National: 2005–06

References

1986 births
Living people
People from Niort
French footballers
Association football defenders
Chamois Niortais F.C. players
Stade Lavallois players
Stade de Reims players
AS Cherbourg Football players
ÉFC Fréjus Saint-Raphaël players
Le Puy Foot 43 Auvergne players
Ligue 2 players
Championnat National players
Championnat National 3 players
Championnat National 2 players
Régional 1 players
Sportspeople from Deux-Sèvres
Footballers from Nouvelle-Aquitaine